Whispering Mountains also known as Rahas kiyana kandu is a 2023 Sri Lankan Sinhala-language drama film written and directed by Jagath Manuwarna on his feature film directorial debut. The film won the NETPAC Award for being adjudged as the best Asian feature film at the 52nd International Film Festival Rotterdam. The film was also premiered at The Bright Future programme category at the 2022 International Film Festival.

Cast 

 Sarath Kothalawala
 Dharmapriya Dias
 Priyantha Sirikumara
 Sampath Chaminda Jayaweera

Plot 
A supernatural virus is spreading like a wildfire in across various parts of Sri Lanka sending shockwaves to the general public. The harsh reality is the youngsters being the main victims due to this virus as many young people commit suicide. The Disease Control Unit takes oath and promise taking responsibility to control the terrifying pandemic by any means necessary, citing supernatural forces that only ancient healing rituals can vanquish. As parents mourn the deaths and disappearances of their children, government henchmen prepare the bodies and the remaining living prisoners for a cleansing of disturbing proportions.

See also 

 List of Sri Lankan films of the 2020s

References

External links 

 

2023 films
2020s Sinhala-language films